Gilles (Ægidius) (died before 1193), was Count of Montaigu and Clermont, Count of Duras, son of Count Godefried of Montaigu, and his wife Juliane, daughter of Count Otto of Duras. Gilles was also Seigneur of Rochefort, Seigneur of Jodoigne and advocate of Saint-Trond.

In 1174, Gilles married Laurette de Looz, daughter of Louis I, Count of Looz, and his wife Agnes von Metz. They divorced childless in 1176.

Gilles contracted leprosy, giving up most of his lands to his brothers Conon and Pierre.  Gilles was succeeded as Count of Montaigu, Clermont and Duras by his brother Conon, possibly as early as 1175.  In a charter dated 1175 donating property to the Knights Hospitaller, Gilles is referred to as former count and his brothers Pierre and Conon as Counts of Montaigu and Duras, respectively. He kept the lordship of Jodoigne and was then at least once referred to as count of Jodoigne. (His mother had also referred to herself as countess of Jodoigne.

Leprosy, however, was not the end of his military life, as Gislebert of Mons as he and his brother Conon fought the duke of Louvain, for seizing Duras and Jodoigne, his only remaining allod. They were able to recover Duras. Moreover, he writes of his capture in the town of Namur by Baldwin V, Count of Hainaut, who held him captive for a long time. Gilles and his brothers prepared to go on crusade, though Gilles probably never went ahead with this plan. None of the brothers had heirs, and so arrangements were made for their possessions.

References

Sources 
Hanon de Louvet (1941) Histoire de la Ville de Jodoigne
 Wolters, Joseph Mathias, Notice Historique sur l’Ancien Comté de Duras en Hesbaie, Gyselinck, 1855 (available on Google Books)
.

External link
 Medieval Lands Project, Comtes de Montaigu

12th-century deaths
Counts of Montaigu